Walter Browne (1949–2015) was an Australian-born American chess grandmaster and poker player.

Walter Browne may refer to:
 Walter Browne (priest) (1855–1959), Archdeacon of Rochester 
 Walter R. Browne (1842–1884), English civil engineer and Christian writer

See also
 Walter Brown (disambiguation)